Mumbai BRTS is a bus rapid transit system in Mumbai, India.

History
The project was taken up by the MCGM, B.E.S.T Undertaking, and MMRDA to ease the traffic conditions of Mumbai and improve bus services.  A BRTS fleet consisting of the BEST Undertaking's CNG powered JCBL Cerita buses, Tata Starbuses, and Tata Marcopolo Buses was introduced in 2008. However, the BRTS did not have dedicated lanes and had to share roads with regular traffic with no right of way privileges. This resulted in a system that was a BRTS only in name.

The project to provide a BRTS with dedicated lanes was first proposed in 2003.

On 7 September 2012, BEST announced that it would build BRTS with dedicated lanes on Ghatkopar-Mankhurd Link Road (GMLR). The project will cost  and will require widening the GMLR and paving the service road with concrete.
Bus routes for Mumbai can be viewed on Mumbai Bus Routes

In 2015 it was revealed that Mumbai's first BRTS corridor would actually be along the Western Express Highway.  BRTS service is also planned for the Eastern Express Highway.

See also
 BEST Bus
 Brihanmumbai Electric Supply and Transport

References

External links

2008 establishments in Maharashtra
Transport in Mumbai
Bus rapid transit in India